Mekhong Full Moon Party (literally, "The 15th Day of the 11th Month") is a 2002 Thai comedy-drama about the Naga fireballs that arise from the Mekong at Nong Khai on the full moon in October. Written by Jira Maligool, the film was also Jira's directorial debut.

The film takes a semi-documentary approach to its subject, examining the phenomenon and its accompanying festival, which draws thousands of people to Nong Khai each year, as well as providing a glimpse at Isan culture, Thai folklore and such practices as eating insects.

Plot

Khan, a Nong Khai native now attending university in Bangkok comes home for the annual Naga fireballs festival, just as a debate is raging over the cause of the fireballs. A local physician, Dr. Nortai, believes there is a scientific explanation for the phenomenon. A university professor, Dr. Suraphol, thinks the fireballs are manmade and are a hoax.

Khan knows the truth: Having grown up as a dek wat at a Buddhist temple across the river in Laos, he helped the temple's abbot and the monks there to create fireballs and plant them on the bed on the Mekong. It is how he grew up to become such a strong swimmer and obtain an athletic scholarship.

The temple's abbot, Luang Poh Loh, seeks Khan out and begs him to once again help with the planting of the fireballs. But Khan, weary of perpetuating a myth and of the crowds that accompany it, refuses.

This sets up a conflict between science and religion that threatens to change the annual celebration.

For his part, Luang Poh Loh is philosophical, advising "Do what you believe, believe in what you do."

Cast
 Anuchyd Sapanphong as Khan
 Noppadol Duangporn as Luang Por Loh 
 Boonchai Limathibul as Dr. Norati 
 Somlek Sakdikul as Dr. Surapol
 Thidarat Chareonchaichana as Teacher Alice 
 Boonsri Yindee as Aunt Oong 
 Surasee Patham as Headmaster
 Jonathan Morrill as Phelong

Festivals and awards
The film won nine awards at the Thailand National Film Awards, including honors for best picture, best director and best screenplay for Jira Maligool and best actor to Noppadol Duangporn.

It won the International Federation of Film Critics award at the Hong Kong International Film Festival and was in the Association of Southeast Asian Nations competition at the 2003 Bangkok International Film Festival.

The film had its world premiere at the Vancouver International Film Festival and was screened at many other festivals including the Seattle International Film Festival and the Stockholm International Film Festival.

External links
 

2002 films
2002 comedy-drama films
Films about religion
Thai-language films
Films about Buddhism
Best Picture Suphannahong National Film Award winners
Thai national heritage films
2002 directorial debut films
Thai comedy-drama films